Manuel Vázquez Hueso (born 31 March 1981 in Churriana de la Vega, Spain) is a professional road racing cyclist currently suspended. On 26 April 2010 he was provisionally suspended by the UCI for a suspected blood doping offense, after being tested positive for EPO on 20 March 2010 in an out-of-competition control. On 14 January 2011 the Spanish Cycling Federation suspended him for two years, starting 26 April 2010 and all results achieved after 20 March 2010 annulled.

Major results 

2006
 1st Stage 3 Vuelta a La Rioja
2007
 1st Overall Volta ao Alentejo
1st Stage 1
2008
 2nd Overall Volta a la Comunitat Valenciana
1st Stage 3
 3rd Overall Regio-Tour
1st Stage 1
2009
 3rd Vuelta a La Rioja
2010
 3rd Trofeo Inca

References

External links

Spanish male cyclists
1981 births
Living people
Doping cases in cycling
Spanish sportspeople in doping cases
Sportspeople from the Province of Granada
Cyclists from Andalusia